Gould Lake Conservation Area is a rural conservation area located in the Canadian Shield northwest of the community of Sydenham in the Township of South Frontenac, Frontenac County, in eastern Ontario, Canada. The area was created to manage water resources, preserve wildlife habitat, and provide recreational and educational opportunities, and is managed by the Cataraqui Region Conservation Authority. The conservation area contains much of Gould Lake.

Geology and geography
The conservation area lies just north of the bedrock scarp that denotes the boundary between the Canadian Shield of the Frontenac Axis with its Precambrian bedrock and the Paleozoic Ordovician formations to the south. The bedrock was significantly eroded by the glaciers of the Late Wisconsinan age.

The headwaters of the Millhaven Creek system lies within the area. Gould Lake drains south through Silvers Lake and Little Long Lake and then into Eel Bay, an extension of Sydenham Lake. Sydenham Lake in turn drains into Millhaven Creek, which flows to Lake Ontario. The park's watershed is thus in the Great Lakes Basin.

Nature and ecology
Lying within the Great Lakes-St. Lawrence forest region, tree species that grow in the conservation area include eastern hemlock, white cedar, yellow birch, white birch, eastern white pine, red maple, sugar maple, and black spruce. Wildlife include white-tailed deer, beaver, black bear, and muskrat. Species of fish within Gould Lake include smallmouth and largemouth bass, pumpkinseed, and yellow perch.

History
Industrial expansion in the 19th century led to the opening of several mica mines in the Gould Lake area. A number of old mine pits and other mining relics can be seen. The McClatchy Mine, which operated until 1912, originally mined phosphate until it was sold and then mined for mica.

The Cataraqui Region Conservation Authority bought land that would become the conservation area between 1967 and 1973.

Facilities and activities
Gould Lake Conservation Area is a day-use area; no camping is permitted. Picnicking, fishing, canoeing, wildlife viewing, cross country skiing, hiking, and swimming are the main activities visitors participate in. The Limestone District School Board uses the original barn located near the beach as the focus of its outdoor education programs at the property.

References

 Gould Lake Conservation Area Retrieved December 19, 2013
 Gould Lake Conservation Area Retrieved December 19, 2013
 Ontario Ministry of Natural Resources – Ontario's Forest Regions: Great Lakes-St. Lawrence Forest Retrieved December 19, 2013
 Gould Lake Retrieved December 19, 2013
 Gould Lake Conservation Area Retrieved December 19, 2013
 Frontenac Arch Biosphere – Gould Lake Conservation Area Retrieved December 19, 2013
 
 Quaternary Geology, Sydenham Area, Southern Ontario Retrieved December 19, 3013

External links

  Map of South End of Gould Lake Indicating Facilities and Trails
 Map of Gould Lake Indicating Conservation Area Property, Facilities and Trails

Conservation areas in Ontario
Protected areas of Frontenac County